The 2014 Pan American Gymnastics Championships were held in Mississauga, Ontario, Canada, August 20–September 1, 2014. The competition was organized by the Canadian Gymnastics Federation and approved by the International Gymnastics Federation.

Medalists

Artistic gymnastics

Rhythmic gymnastics

Trampoline gymnastics

Medal table

References

External links 
 USA Gymnastics - Results

Pan American Gymnastics
Pan American Gymnastics Championships
International gymnastics competitions hosted by Canada
Pan American Gymnastics
Pan American Gymnastics
Pan American TGymnastics Championships
Pan American Gymnastics Championships
Qualification tournaments for the 2015 Pan American Games